Fatoumata Lejeune-Kaba (born 1969) is a Guinean journalist who works for the UNHCR as Communications Officer.
 
Kaba was educated in the United States, attending the Woodrow Wilson High School and Montgomery College in Maryland and graduating with a degree in journalism. She returned to Guinea in 1992, working for Guinean Radio and Television and CNN; in 1998, she became a correspondent for Reuters news agency. Subsequently, she worked for the Communications Unit of the United Nations Development Programme before joining the United Nations High Commission for Refugees (UNHCR) in 2000.

On February 25, 2002, Kaba was appointed as the delegate of the UNHCR for the Democratic Republic of the Congo, the Republic of the Congo, the Central African Republic, Gabon, Cameroon, and Uganda; she was based in Kinshasa. She was also in Ivory Coast or Côte d'Ivoire after that. She is currently in Geneva as the Communications Officer covering Central, East, West and Southern Africa and Statistics.

References

1969 births
Living people
Guinean journalists
Guinean women journalists